Tom Varley was a collector, restorer and preserver of steam-powered road vehicles, known for the Tom Varley Collection, a steam museum mostly of steam wagons, "a lasting legacy of which [British steam road enthusiasts] can be proud".

His business was in running Todber Caravan Park at Gisburn, in the high Pennines of Lancashire. The steam museum was housed in a barn alongside the caravans. The collection was best known from its frequent appearances at steam rallies through the 1970s and '80s. Varley's wagons were recognisable from their fine paintwork and signwriting, each named and prefixed Pendle ....

Six of his rarer, and often unique survivors, were re-imported from Australia before restoration.

Tom Varley died December 12th 1990. His contribution to the preservation of steam vehicles in the UK has been widely recognised.

List of vehicles 

 These vehicles have at one point formed part of the Tom Varley collection. Since his death, some have now been sold on to other owners, and may have been renamed.

Notes

References

External links

Steam museums in England
Traction engines
1990s deaths
Year of birth missing